Hom is a dispersed settlement in the Municipality of Šentrupert in southeastern Slovenia. The area is part of the historical region of Lower Carniola. The municipality is now included in the Southeast Slovenia Statistical Region.

The local church is dedicated to the Holy Spirit and belongs to the Parish of Šentrupert. It is a Romanesque building with remains of 16th-century frescos.

References

External links

Hom at Geopedia

Populated places in the Municipality of Šentrupert